Lewis V. Baldwin is a historian, author, and professor specializing in the history of the black churches in the United States.  He is an acknowledged expert on the Spencer Churches, the oldest black denominations in the country.  He currently teaches at Vanderbilt University.

External links
Vanderbilt's webpage about Dr. Baldwin
South Africa with Prof. Lewis V. Baldwin; Dr. Martin Luther King Jr., 1993-10-01, In Black America; KUT Radio, American Archive of Public Broadcasting (WGBH and the Library of Congress)

Historians of the United States
Vanderbilt University faculty
Living people
Year of birth missing (living people)
21st-century American historians
21st-century American male writers
American historians of religion
American male non-fiction writers